Tokhoy is a rural locality (a selo) in Dzhidinsky District, Republic of Buryatia, Russia. The population was 261 as of 2010. There are 3 streets.

Geography 
Tokhoy is located 32 km southwest of Petropavlovka (the district's administrative centre) by road. Stary Ukyrchelon is the nearest rural locality.

References 

Rural localities in Dzhidinsky District